Major-General Charles Basil Price  ("C.B." or "Basil"; 12 December 1889 − 15 February 1975) was a Canadian Army officer who served in both of the world wars. He joined the Victoria Rifles of Canada in 1905 and received an officer's commission in 1914. Soon after, he responded to the outbreak of World War I by resigning his commission to join the Royal Montreal Regiment as a company sergeant-major. He became a commissioned officer again through a series of promotions.

The Great War and after
As a major in the Royal Montreal Regiment, he received the Distinguished Service Order and the Distinguished Conduct Medal. He married Marjorie Trenholme (3 November 1891 – 1 September 1979) on 23 August 1915. The couple raised six children: Marjorie (1918–1988), Lyall (1920–1942), Helen (1922–2014), Ann (1928–1997), Isabel (1930–1997), and John (1930–1993). He was promoted to lieutenant-colonel and took command of the Royal Montreal Regiment until his retirement on 31 December 1929. As a civilian, he became managing director of Elmhurst Dairy. In January 1931 he became an alderman in Westmount.

In 1939 he was President of the Brome Lake Boating Club at Knowlton, Quebec.

World War II and postwar life
He re-enlisted and was posted to the United Kingdom. As a major-general, he commanded the 3rd Canadian Infantry Division from 14 March 1941 until 7 September 1942, when he became the Overseas Commissioner of the Canadian Red Cross Society. In that post, which he held until the war ended, he strove to ensure that all Allied prisoners of war received equal benefits, including one large Red Cross parcel per month containing the best food available (white-flour biscuits; butter instead of oleomargarine, etc.). In 1944 he joined John Bracken's team as the Progressive Conservative candidate in Saint-Antoine—Westmount, and lost to the Liberal incumbent Douglas Charles Abbott by just 60 votes in the 1945 federal election. Later he retired and moved to Knowlton.

Sources
 Stacey, Colonel C. P. (1955). Six Years of War: The Army in Canada, Britain and the Pacific. Ottawa: Queen's Printer and Controller of Stationery.
 Vance, Jonathan F. (1997). Objects of Concern: Canadian Prisoners of War Through the Twentieth Century. Vancouver: University of British Columbia Press.
 The Shawinigan Standard, 23 November 1938, Page 1.

References

External links
Generals of World War II

1889 births
1975 deaths
Canadian recipients of the Distinguished Conduct Medal
Canadian Companions of the Distinguished Service Order
Progressive Conservative Party of Canada candidates for the Canadian House of Commons
Candidates in the 1945 Canadian federal election
Canadian Army generals of World War II
Canadian Expeditionary Force officers
Canadian generals
Canadian military personnel of World War I
Victoria Rifles of Canada